Wheelstand competition is a form of motorsport where specially prepared vehicles compete in order to have the highest, longest, most photogenic and violent wheelstand, normally in dragstrips or Monster Trucks.

This is not a very popular form of motorsport but it has grown in North America.

Competitions

The most famous competition is the World Power Wheel Standing Championships held at Byron Dragway, which has been televised in SPEED TV's Lucas Oil On the Edge. This competitions attract drivers from Canada and United States of America.

Monster Trucks have wheelstand competitions as well in some of the events, but here they do them while crushing cars beneath them.

External links
World Power Wheel Standing Championships, Byron Dragway
Halloween Classic

Drag racing